When the Boys Meet the Girls is a 1965 American musical film directed by Alvin Ganzer and starring Connie Francis and Harve Presnell based on the musical Girl Crazy and a remake of MGM's 1943 film Girl Crazy.

Plot
A playboy (Harve Presnell) helps a young woman (Connie Francis) turn her father's Nevada ranch into a haven for divorcees.

Cast
Connie Francis – Ginger Gray
Harve Presnell – Danny Churchill
Peter Noone – Himself (as Herman's Hermits)
Karl Green – Himself (as Herman's Hermits)
Derek Leckenby – Himself (as Herman's Hermits)
Keith Hopwood – Himself (as Herman's Hermits)
Barry Whitwam – Himself (as Herman's Hermits)
Louis Armstrong – Himself
Buddy Catlett  – Himself
Domingo Samudio – Sam the Sham (as Sam the Sham)
Dave Martin – Pharaoh (as The Pharaohs)
Ray Stinnet – Pharaoh (as The Pharaohs)
Jerry Patterson – Pharaoh (as The Pharaohs)
Butch Gibson – Pharaoh (as The Pharaohs)
Liberace – Himself
Sue Ane Langdon – Tess Rawley
Fred Clark – Bill Denning
Frank Faylen – Phin Gray
Joby Baker – Sam
Hortense Petra – Kate
Stanley Adams – Lank
Romo Vincent – Pete
Susan Holloway – Delilah
Russell Collins – Mr. Stokes (as Russ Collins)
Pepper Davis – Himself
Bill Quinn – Dean of Colby (as William I. Quinn)
Tony Reese – Himself

Production
The film was a remake of MGM's Girl Crazy (1943 film). The remake was produced by Sam Katzman, who made it as the first of five films he did for the studio in 1965. In April 1965 Connie Francis was attached as star.

In June 1965 Jeffrey Hayden was to direct and the stars were announced as Connie Francis, Harve Presnell, Paul Anka, Fran Jeffries and Louis Armstrong.

The title was changed to I've Got Rhythm then When the Boys Meet the Girls.

Presnell played the same role as Mickey Rooney in the original. Presnell said "When we did Molly Brown on Broadway, we had a standing joke whenever I didn't do something right. I said 'Well why don't you get Mickey Rooney?'."

Filming started July 1965.

It was the film debut of Herman's Hermits. MGM were so pleased with their performance they put them in a series of films.

Soundtrack

Track listing

Reception
The New York Times called it "terrible".

Awards
In 1966, the year after the film was released, it received some prestigious awards at that year's Laurel Awards ceremony. Harve Presnell was nominated for a Golden Laurel in the category of Musical Performance, Male for his talented musical numbers. Though he did not win, he was awarded 3rd place. Connie Francis was also nominated for a Golden Laurel in the category of Musical Performance, Female for her musical numbers. She did not win either, but came in a gratifying 4th place.

References

External links
 
When the Boys Meet the Girls at TCMDB
Soundtrackcollector.com
Review at Variety

Review at the Spinning Image

1965 films
1965 musical films
American films based on plays
George Gershwin in film
Metro-Goldwyn-Mayer films
Recordings of music by George Gershwin
American musical films
1960s English-language films
Films directed by Alvin Ganzer
1960s American films